Elections to Portsmouth City Council were held on 2 May 2002.  The whole council was up for election with boundary changes since the last election in 2000 increasing the number of seats by 3. The council stayed under no overall control, with the Conservatives as the largest party with 15 seats.

Election result

Ward results

Baffins

Central Southsea

Charles Dickens

Copnor

Cosham

Drayton and Farlington

Eastney and Craneswater

Fratton

Hilsea

Milton

Nelson

Paulsgrove

St Jude

St Thomas

References 
2002 Portsmouth election result
 Ward results

2002
2002 English local elections
2000s in Hampshire